Rooney may refer to:

People
Wayne Rooney, English football manager and former player
Rooney family, of the Pittsburgh Steelers American football franchise
Rooney (surname), a surname (including a list of people with the name)
Rooney (given name), a given name (including a list of people with the name)

Places
Rooney, Kentucky, United States

Other
Rooney (band), an alternative rock group from Los Angeles
Rooney (album), a 2003 album by Rooney
Rooney (UK band), a late-nineties lo-fi band from Liverpool
Rooney (film), a 1958 British film by George Pollock
Rooney (mascot), the athletics mascot of Roanoke College in Salem, Virginia

See also